Obsession may refer to:

Psychology
 Celebrity worship syndrome, obsessive addictive disorder to a celebrity's personal and professional life
 Fixation (psychology), a persistent attachment to an object or idea
 Idée fixe (psychology), a preoccupation of mind believed to be firmly resistant to any attempt to modify it
 Obsessive love, an overwhelming, obsessive desire to possess another person
 Obsessive–compulsive disorder, a mental disorder triggering obsessive thoughts

Arts, entertainment, and media

Films
 Ossessione (1943), an Italian crime drama
 Obsession (1949 film), a British thriller also released as The Hidden Room
 Obsession (1954 film), a French-language crime drama
 Obsession (1976 film), a psychological thriller/mystery directed by Brian De Palma
 Obsession (1997 film), a Franco-German drama starring Daniel Craig
 Obsession (2022 film), a Nigerian drama
 Circle of Two, 1981 Canadian drama also distributed as Obsession
 Obsession: Radical Islam's War Against the West, 2005 documentary
 Obsession (2008 Russian film), starring Denis Matrosov
 Obsession, 2011 film directed by Achille Brice
 Obsession (2015 Dutch film), the USA title of Dutch & French language film Rendez-Vous starring Loes Haverkort

Games
 Obsession (video game), a pinball game for the Atari STe and Amiga computers

Literature
 Obsession (book), 1998 nonfiction book by John E. Douglas and Mark Olshaker 
 Obsession (novel), 2007 Alex Delaware novel by Jonathan Kellerman
 Obsession (novella), 1992 novella by Filipino writer, F. Sionil José
 Obsession, 2009 novel by Gloria Vanderbilt
 Obsession, 1962 novel by Lionel White

Music

Performers
 Obsesión (Cuban band), Cuban hip-hop duo
 Obsession (band), a metal band

Albums 
 Obsession (Atomic Forest album) 2011
 Obsession (Blue System album), 1990
 Obsession (Bob James album), 1986
 Obsession (Boyfriend EP), 2014
 Obsession (Dive EP), 1995
 Obsession (Eighteen Visions album), 2004
 Obsession (Exo album), 2019
 Obsession (Rachelle Ann Go album), 2007
 Obsession (Shayne Ward album), 2010
 Obsession (UFO album), 1978
 Obsession (Wallace Roney album), 1991
 Obsesiones, 1992 album by Mexican singer Yuri
 Obsession, 1994 album by Éric Lapointe

Songs 
 "Obsesión" (Aventura song), a 2002 song by Aventura
 "Obsession (I Love You)", a 2003 song by Amiel Daemion on the album Audio Out
 "Obsession" (Animotion song), 1984
 "Obsession" (Army of Lovers song), 1991
 "Obsession" (Exo song), 2019
 "Obsession" (Nudimension song), 1984
 "Obsession" (Shayne Ward song), 2011
 "Obsession" (Sky Ferreira song), 2010
 "Obsession" (Tich song), 2013
 "Obsession" (Tiësto song), 2002
 "Obsessions", a 2002 song by Suede
 "Obsessions" (Marina and the Diamonds song), 2009
 "Obsession", a song by Delirious? on the album Cutting Edge Fore
 "Obsession", a song by G-Dragon on the album GD & TOP
 "Obsession", a song by Kylie Minogue from Body Language
 "Obsession", a song by OK Go on the album Hungry Ghosts
 "Obsession", a song by Scorpions on the album Eye II Eye
 "Obsession", a song by See-Saw, the opening theme of the series .hack//Sign
 "Obsession", a song by Shinee on the album Lucifer
 "Obsession", a song by Siouxsie & The Banshees on the album A Kiss in the Dreamhouse
 "Obsession", a song by Cabaret Voltaire on The Voice of America
 "Obsession", a song by Xymox

Television
 Obsession (TV series), a 2014 Filipino medical drama

Episodes
 "Obsession" (CSI: NY), 2007
 "Obsession" (NCIS), 2010
 "Obsession" (Sliders), 1996
 "Obsession" (Smallville), 2004
 "Obsession" (Star Trek: The Original Series), 1967
 "Obsession" (Superman: The Animated Series), 1998
 "Obsession" (Third Watch), 2004
 "Obsession" (X-Men: The Animated Series), 1994

Other uses
 Obsession (perfume) by Calvin Klein
 Obsession (Spiritism), interference of a subjugating spirit with a weaker spirit in Spiritism
 Obsession Telescopes, an American telescope manufacturer

See also
 Fixation (disambiguation)
 Obsessed (disambiguation)
 Obsesión (disambiguation)